Melaleuca ulicoides is a plant in the myrtle family, Myrtaceae and is endemic to the south of Western Australia. It is a small, densely foliaged shrub with small heads of white or cream flowers in spring. It is closely related to Melaleuca marginata but can be distinguished from it by the number and character of leaf veins.

Description
Its leaves are arranged alternately, narrow triangular to narrow egg-shaped tapering to a sharp, prickly point and crescent-moon shape in cross section. (Melaleuca marginata has between 7 and 17 equally indistinct veins.) There are also many distinct oil glands in the leaves.

The stamens are arranged in bundles of five around the flower, with 18 to 28 stamens in each bundle.

Taxonomy and naming
Melaleuca ulicoides was first described in 2010 by Lyndley Craven in Nuytsia from a specimen collected in 1965 by Alex George. The specific epithet (ulicoides) is a reference to the similarity of this species to a species of gorse Ulex in the pea family, Fabaceae.

Distribution and habitat
This melaleuca occurs in the Hopetoun and Ravensthorpe districts in the Esperance Plains biogeographic region where it grows in gravelly clay loam in mallee.

Conservation
Melaleuca ulicoides is listed as "not threatened" by the Government of Western Australia Department of Parks and Wildlife.

References

ulicoides
Myrtales of Australia
Plants described in 2010
Endemic flora of Western Australia
Taxa named by Lyndley Craven